Nikolaus P. Himmelmann (born 2 August 1959) is a German linguist. His interests include linguistic typology, grammar, prosody, and linguistic documentation.

He obtained his doctorate at the Ludwig Maximilian University of Munich in 1986 and habilitation at the University of Cologne in 1995. From 1996 to 1998, he was a research fellow at the Australian National University. Afterwards, he was a professor at Ruhr University in Bochum (1999–2007) and at Westphalian Wilhelms-University in Münster (2007–2010). In 2010, he was appointed Professor of General Linguistics at the University of Cologne.

He is the co-editor of the book The Austronesian languages of Asia and Madagascar (2005).

References

Living people
1959 births
Linguists of Austronesian languages
Linguists from Germany
Ludwig Maximilian University of Munich alumni